In geometry the Morley centers are two special points associated with a plane triangle. Both of them are triangle centers. One of them called first Morley center (or simply, the Morley center ) is designated as X(356) in Clark Kimberling's Encyclopedia of Triangle Centers, while the other point called second Morley center (or the 1st Morley–Taylor–Marr Center) is designated as X(357). The two points are also related to Morley's trisector theorem which was discovered by Frank Morley in around 1899.

Definitions

Let DEF be the triangle formed by the intersections of the adjacent angle trisectors of triangle ABC. Triangle DEF is called the Morley triangle of triangle ABC. Morley's trisector theorem states that the Morley triangle of any triangle is always an equilateral triangle.

First Morley center

Let DEF be the Morley triangle of triangle ABC. The centroid of triangle DEF is called the first Morley center of triangle ABC.

Second Morley center

Let DEF be the Morley triangle of triangle ABC. Then, the lines AD, BE and CF are concurrent. The point of concurrence is called the second Morley center of triangle ABC.

Trilinear coordinates

First Morley center

The trilinear coordinates of the first Morley center of triangle ABC are 
 cos ( A/3 ) + 2 cos ( B/3 ) cos ( C/3 ) : cos ( B/3 ) + 2 cos ( C/3 ) cos ( A/3 ) : cos ( C/3 ) + 2 cos ( A/3 ) cos ( B/3 ).

Second Morley center

The trilinear coordinates of the second Morley center are

 sec ( A/3 ) : sec ( B/3 ) : sec ( C/3 ).

References

Triangle centers